Jonah Attuquaye is a Ghanaian professional footballer who plays as midfielder for Latvian Higher League side FK Auda.

Career 
Attuquaye played for Berekum Chelsea from 2019 to 2020. He later moved to Legon Cities in 2020 in the club's bid to bolster their squad ahead of the 2020–21 Ghana Premier League season.

Attuquaye made his international debut for Ghana in July 2022 during the 2022 African Nations Championship qualification, and played the 2022 African Nations Championship. Ahead of the 2023 season he moved to Europe, and Latvian Higher League side FK Auda.

References

External links 

2000 births
Living people
Ghanaian footballers
Association football midfielders
Ghana A' international footballers
2022 African Nations Championship players
Ghanaian expatriate footballers
Expatriate footballers in Latvia
Ghanaian expatriate sportspeople in Latvia
Berekum Chelsea F.C. players
Legon Cities FC players
FK Auda players